Doosukeltha is a 2013 Indian Telugu-language action comedy film directed by Veeru Potla. It stars Manchu Vishnu and Lavanya Tripathi. Mani Sharma composed the music for the film. Mohan Babu produced the film under the banner of 24 Frames Factory.

Plot
A small bet by Chinna during his childhood results in his family escaping from a village. Eventually, he grows up to become a street smart and intelligent man with a kind heart. Due to his act, the life of Alekhya also gets disturbed, and her family immediately  disowns her. She grows up to become a doctor, and a chance incident gets her in touch with Chinna. He starts liking her and also protects her from some unidentified killers. However, after discovering his real identity, Alekhya puts him away. In order to repair the mistake that he did in his childhood, Chinna decides to get Alekhya back to her family, and whether that happens or not forms the rest of the story.

Cast

Soundtrack
The music was composed by Mani Sharma and released by Junglee Music. All lyrics were written by Ramajogayya Sastry.

Release
The film was released on 17 October 2013 to over 900 screens.

Box office

India
The film opened with 85–90% occupancy on the first day and earned  16.63 crore. On the film's first weekend, profits were approximately  357.5 million at the box office. Doosukeltha earned  in its first week. The film became Manchu Vishnu's biggest opener in his career. Final worldwide earnings were  200.5 million, also making it the biggest hit ever in Vishnu Manchu's overseas career.

Overseas
The film was released on 43 screens overseas. In the first weekend alone it earned  2.5 million at the box office and  22.5 million at the box office overseas. The film record of Denikaina Reddy also starred Manchu Vishnu. The film is also the highest earning film in a Vishu's career. Doosukeltha earned  12.5 million net in the overseas market.

Critical reception
The film received mixed reviews from critics. reviewers gave it a score of 5/10 average stating that it was an "Family entertainer with a decent mix of action elements." Idlebrain.com wrote: "First half of the film deals with action and romance episodes. The second half has entertainment and family orientation. Doosukeltha is a film that follows commercial format of entertainment movies to a T. Plus points are Vishnu and entertainment in the second half."

References

External links
 

2013 films
Films scored by Mani Sharma
2010s Telugu-language films
2013 action comedy films
Indian action comedy films
2013 masala films
Films shot in Slovenia